Maslow may refer to:

 Masłów (disambiguation), a Polish place-name
 Abraham Maslow
 Maslow's hierarchy of needs, a theory in psychology proposed by Abraham Maslow
 Maslow CNC, an open-source CNC router project
 Maslov, a Russian surname
 Maslova Pristan, an urban-type settlement in Belgorod Oblast, Russia

See also 
 Maslo, a surname
 Maslow's hammer